Núria Espert Romero (born 11 June 1935 in L'Hospitalet de Llobregat, Catalonia, Spain) is a Spanish theatre and television actor, and theatre and opera director.

When she was 19 years old, she married the actor Armando Moreno, who would later become her manager.

As a tribute to this actor, the city of Fuenlabrada named a theatre "Sala Municipal de Teatro Núria Espert".

Professional trajectory 
Núria Espert studied high school at the Maragall Institute in Barcelona and later completed her studies with music and Languages. At only sixteen years of age, she began to work in amateur theatre and in the 1950s she had the opportunity to perform, in her native Barcelona, great classics such as La vida es sueño (Life is a Dream) (1950) and El jardinero de Falerina (The Gardener of Falerina) (1953), by Calderón de la Barca; Los empeños de una casa (1952), by Sor Juana Inés de la Cruz; or Romeo and Juliet (1953), by Shakespeare, adapted into Catalan by Josep Maria de Sagarra. In this language she interpreted numerous works, such as El marit vé de visita (1951).

Her big break came in 1954, when she replaced actor Elvira Noriega in Medea. The triumph she achieved through her performance at the Teatre Grec in Barcelona was decisive for her to dedicate herself to acting in a professional manner. During the following years, and as part of the Lope de Vega Company directed by José Tamayo, she consolidated her position as one of the figures on the Catalan and Spanish scenes. In this line, she obtained success in plays like El caballero de Olmedo (1954), by Lope de Vega; La muralla (1955), by Joaquín Calvo Sotelo; Julio César (1955), by William Shakespeare, together with Mary Carrillo; Las brujas de Salem (1957), by Arthur Miller; or; Don Juan Tenorio (1958), by Zorrilla, together with Luis Prendes.

In 1959, she created her own theater company and, shortly after, she premiered Gigí at the Recoletos Theater in Madrid and Eugene O'Neill's play, Anna Christie.

Europe Theatre Prize 
In 2018, she was awarded a Special Prize of the XVII Europe Theatre Prize, in Saint Petersburg. The Prize organization stated:It is not at all common that the growth of an extraordinary artistic talent should coincide with the development of parallel human qualities. Since her birth in 1935, Núria Espert is that rare example of a tireless, sensitive and empathetic actress who, from the start of an acting career at barely 13 years old that grew side by side with a life of cultural passions, civil and political engagement, has become an icon of the Twentieth Century and contemporary life. Woman of the theatre, still fully active today, she has journeyed from the classics (she has several times played an unforgettable Medea) to Garcia Lorca, plunged into the most contemporary theatre, auteur cinema, and directing in film and theatre, not forgetting some important work in directing opera. Peter Brook likened her to ‘a glass of water that can freeze and boil at the same time’. For his part, Terenci Moix claims she is made of ‘air and fire’. It is no surprise that the unforgettable José Monleón, who valued her highly and once put her in touch with Jerzy Grotowski, allowing her to discover his theatre, should have put her name forward several times in the world of European theatre. Núria Espert is not only a fantastic theatre animal, difficult to cage: she is truly a free spirit, creative, multi-faceted, unpredictable, passionate and soaring. Now, this year, the Special Prize is added to the many awards she has received in her long career, to recall her genius, ductility and civil engagement, transmitted through an art that fully represents the ideal of a Europe that is united, open, democratic and culturally active.

Prizes
1984 Premio Nacional de Teatro
2016 Premio Princesa de Asturias de las Artes
2018 Europe Theatre Prize - Special Prize

Filmography
1954: Once pares de botas
1958: La tirana
1961: A las cinco de la tarde
1971: Viva la muerte
1976: La ciutat cremada
1991: The House of Bernarda Alba
1996: actors
2003: Soneto
2007: Barcelona (un mapa)

Theatre

1969: The Maids
1973: Yerma
1981: Doña Rosita la soltera
1981: Medea
1983: The Tempest
1985: Salome
1990: Maquillaje
1998: Master Class
1999: Who's Afraid of Virginia Woolf?
2003: La Celestina
2006: Play Strindberg
2007: Hay que purgar a Totó
2009: La casa de Bernarda Alba

Opera 
 1987: Madama Butterfly, Giacomo Puccini.
 1988: Rigoletto, Giuseppe Verdi.
 1988: Elektra, Richard Strauss.
 1989: La Traviata, Giuseppe Verdi.
 1991: Carmen, Georges Bizet.
 1995: Stiffelio, Giuseppe Verdi.
 1999: Turandot, Giacomo Puccini.
 2004: Tosca, Giacomo Puccini.
 2012: Ainadamar, Osvaldo Golijov.

References

External links

1935 births
Living people
Stage actresses from Catalonia
Catalan film actors
Women theatre directors
20th-century Spanish actresses
21st-century Spanish actresses
Actresses from Catalonia